Caviahue Airport is a private use airstrip located  east-northeast of Caviahue, Neuquén, Argentina. It was a public airport until the 1990s, when it was abandoned. Its IATA (CVH), ICAO (SAHE) and local (CAV) codes were dropped. The runway is now in poor condition and the airport is for private use only.

See also
List of airports in Argentina

References

External links 
 Airport record for Caviahue Airport at Landings.com

Airports in Neuquén Province